Ent-cassa-12,15-diene 11-hydroxylase (Formerly , ent-cassadiene C11alpha-hydroxylase, CYP76M7) is an enzyme with systematic name ent-cassa-12,15-diene,NADPH:oxygen 11-oxidoreductase. This enzyme catalyses the following chemical reaction

 ent-cassa-12,15-diene + O2 + NADPH + H+  ent-11beta-hydroxycassa-12,15-diene + NADP+ + H2O

Ent-cassa-12,15-diene 11-hydroxylase requires cytochrome P450.

References

External links 
 

EC 1.14.14